B. Rakesh (Rakesh Bahuleyan) is an Indian film producer and the owner of Universal Cinemas, who has contributed to the Malayalam film Industry. He has produced Malayalam movies under his Universal Cinemas banner, including Vakkalathu Narayanankutty, Njan Salperu Ramankutty, Malayalimaamanu Vanakkam, Rathrimazha, One by Two, Pullikaran Stara, Sakhavu and Dakini, Meri Naam Shaji and Meri Awaaz Suno. 

He is also credited as the producer of the first Malayalam mega serial, Vamsham, penned by Sri. K Jayakumar and directed by Seekumar Krishan Nair.   His association with the television industry was long and he produced programmes for Doordarshan, which included Chitrageetham and Smrithylayam. He has produced the serial Parudeesayilakkoru Paatha, directed Madhavikutty's Balyakalasmaranakal and 260 episode serial Suryakanthi. His television serial Eswaran Saakshiyaai (Flowers (TV channel), 2015) received five main Kerala state government television awards, including best serial and best director.

Filmography

References

Living people
Film producers from Kochi
Malayalam film producers
Year of birth missing (living people)